Against Nature? was an exhibition on homosexuality in animals made by the Natural History Museum at the University of Oslo, Norway. The exhibition focused on the occurrence and function of homosexuality in animals. It ran from September 2006 to August 2007.

History
The exhibit contained pictures, animals and models of species known to engage in homosexuality, showing among other things southern right whales and giraffes engaged in same-sex pairing. The museum said one of its aims was to "help to de-mystify homosexuality among people... we hope to reject the all too well known argument that homosexual behaviour is a crime against nature." Most of the exhibition was based on the works of Bruce Bagemihl and Joan Roughgarden.

The exhibition was initiated by the Norwegian Archive, Library and Museum Authority (ABM) as part of their "Break" program, encouraging museums, libraries and archives to do research and exhibitions of controversial and taboo subjects. The exhibition was a direct answer to this challenge, and received financial support from ABM.

Reception
The exhibition was well received, including by the museum's regular visiting groups, mainly families. The exhibit was on show in Oslo, Bergen, Trondheim, Maastricht, Genova and in Stockholm (in the last as "Rainbow Animals").

See also
 Sexual orientation and biology

References

External links
Against Nature? exhibition in Oslo
Natural History Museum at the University of Oslo

Ethology
LGBT in Norway
Sexual orientation and science
University of Oslo
Science exhibitions
Works about animal sexuality